Pariyaram is a Grama Panchayat consisting of two  villages viz. Pariyaram census town and Kuttiyeri village. Pariyaram is a suburb of Taliparamba on National Highway (NH 66) between Taliparamba and Payyanur in Kerala state of India. Mini villages of Thiruvattoor, Koran Peedika, Mukkunnu & Chithappile Poyil are parts of Pariyaram.

Educational Institutions
 Government Dental college, Pariyaram
 Government Medical College, Kannur 
 Government Ayurveda Medical College Kannur
 Oushadhi
 K.K.N.Pariyaram Memorial Government Higher Secondary School

Demographics
Total number of households were 4,580 in the town limits. Population of children in age group 0-6 was 2,519 (12.3%) which constitutes 1,249 males and 1,270 females. 
Pariyaram town had overall literacy of 93.2% where male literacy was 96.8% and female literacy was 90%.

Religions
As of 2011 Indian census, Pariyaram census town had total population of 20,405 which constitute 9,329 (45.7%) Hindus, 7,818 (38.3%) Muslims, 3,194 (15.7%) Christians and Others (0.3%).

Administration
Pariyaram Panchayat is part of Taliparamba Assembly constituency under Kannur Loksabha constituency.

Law and Order
Pariyaram Medical College Police Station was established on 10th February 2009 adjacent to the Pariyaram Government Medical College situated in Kadannapalli village. The old station building was renovated and inaugurated on 06.03.2022 by Hon’ble Chief Minister of Kerala, Pinarayi Vijayan. The police station is part of Kannur rural police district and has jurisdiction over Kadannappalli, Panapuzha, Cheruthazham and Pariyaram villages with an area of 118.01 Sq kms.

Transportation
The national highway passes through Pariyaram. Mangalore and Mumbai can be accessed on the northern side and Cochin and Thiruvananthapuram can be accessed on the southern side.  The road from Taliparamba to the east of Iritty connects to Mysore and Bangalore. It will take approximately 45 minutes by Bus to reach Pariyaram from the district headquarters Kannur. The nearest railway stations are Payangadi and Payyannur on Mangalore-Palakkad line. There are airports at  Kannur, Mangalore and Calicut. All of them are international airports but direct flights are available only to Middle Eastern countries.

See also
 Mathamangalam
 Kadannappally
 Vellora
 Olayampadi
 Pilathara
 Eramam
 Kuppam
 Mukkunnu

References

Cities and towns in Kannur district